The 1999 Shell Championship Series was a motor racing series for V8 Supercars which began on 28 March 1999 at Eastern Creek Raceway and ended on 14 November at the Mount Panorama Circuit after 13 rounds. The Australian Touring Car Championship was renamed for 1999 in what was essentially a marketing decision, however the winner of the newly named series was also awarded the 1999 Australian Touring Car Championship title by CAMS. 1999 was the first season since 1977 in which the longer distance, endurance race events were included in the championship. For the first time in the championship's history, tyres supplied by Bridgestone specified for all cars.

This series was won by Craig Lowndes of the Holden Racing Team.

Teams and drivers

The following drivers and teams competed in the 1999 Shell Championship Series. The series consisted of 11 rounds of sprint racing with one driver per car and two rounds (the Queensland 500 and the Bathurst 1000) of endurance racing with each car shared by two drivers.

Race Calendar
The 1999 Shell Championship Series consisted of 13 rounds which included eleven sprint rounds of two or three races and two endurance races (Queensland 500 and FAI 1000). It was the first time since 1977 that endurance races had been included in the championship.

Championship standings

Privateers award
The Privateers award was contested over all rounds except Rounds 2, 12 & 13. Unlike 1998, points were awarded to the driver rather than the team. The best five scores from the ten rounds could be retained by each driver.

See also
1999 Australian Touring Car season

References

External links
 Official V8 Supercar site
 1999 Racing Results Archive
 1999 Australian Touring Car racing images (including the 1999 Shell Championship Series) at autopics.com.au

Supercars Championship seasons
Shell Championship Series
Shell Championship Series